Woodland Beach may refer to:
 Woodland Beach, Delaware
 Woodland Beach, Maryland
 Woodland Beach, Michigan
 Woodland Beach Wildlife Area, located in Kent County, Delaware